Mathias Katamba is a Ugandan economist, business executive, banker and entrepreneur. He is the managing director and chief executive officer of DFCU Bank, the second-largest commercial bank in Uganda, effective January 2019.

Before that, he was the managing director and chief executive officer of Housing Finance Bank, a commercial bank, co-owned by the Ugandan government and the National Social Security Fund (Uganda), a semi-autonomous retirement pension organisation for non-government employees in Uganda.

Education
Katamba had his early education in Uganda, attending St. Mary's College Kisubi for his secondary education. He then entered the University of Greenwich, in England, graduating with the degree of Bachelor of Arts in Economics. His degree of Master of Science in Financial Management was obtained from the University of East London, also in the UK. He also holds the postgraduate Diploma in Public Relations, awarded by the Chartered Institute of Public Relations (CIPR), another UK institution. Over the years, he has attended advanced leadership courses from several institutions, including Harvard Kennedy School and Wharton Business School.

Work experience
Even while still in school, Katamba exhibited entrepreneurial skill, by starting a business during the break between middle and high school.

For the past 10 to 15 years, he has been intimately associated with Uganda's banking industry. He is credited with:

The transformation of Pride Microfinance Limited from a Non-Government Organization (NGO), into a Tier III Deposit-taking microfinance financial institution (MFI).
 The transformation of Uganda Finance Trust Limited, from a Tier III, Deposit-Taking MFI into  a Tier 1 commercial bank, Finance Trust Bank.

In 2011, following 5 years at the helm of Uganda Finance Trust Limited, he took a beak from commercial banking until he was appointed CEO of Housing Finance Bank, in April 2014. Prior to that, he was Managing Partner and co-founder of Progression Capital Africa (PCA), a US$40 million private equity fund based in Mauritius. Before joining Finance Trust Bank, he worked at some national and regional, notable financial institutions; including  Orient Bank (now I&M Bank Uganda, PostBank Uganda and Absa Group Limited.

See also
 Anthony Kituuka
 List of banks in Uganda

References

External links
 Website of National Social Security Fund (Uganda)

Year of birth missing (living people)
Living people
Ganda people
Alumni of the University of Greenwich
Alumni of the University of East London
DFCU Bank people
Ugandan bankers
Ugandan economists
Ugandan businesspeople
Ugandan chief executives
Ugandan business executives